Mandalay Entertainment Group is an American entertainment company founded in 1995 by Peter Guber, with interests in motion pictures, animated films, television, sports entertainment and new media. The name after Mandalay the second-largest city of Myanmar.

Divisions
 Mandalay Pictures is a film production company whose productions include I Know What You Did Last Summer, Donnie Brasco, Seven Years in Tibet, Wild Things, Les Misérables, The Deep End of the Ocean, Sleepy Hollow, The Score, Io and Into the Blue.
 Mandalay Television is a producer of television series, including Cupid, Mercy Point, Rude Awakening, and Brotherhood. It also previously distributed games of its minor league baseball teams owned by Mandalay  Baseball Properties for TV airings. It also produces television films and miniseries. Its productions include Intensity, Get to the Heart: The Barbara Mandrell Story, Bad As I Wanna Be,  Sole Survivor, First Daughter, The Linda McCartney Story, Angels Fall, Blue Smoke, Carolina Moon, Montana Sky, Northern Lights, Midnight Bayou, High Noon and Tribute.
 Mandalay Sports Media  Has a focus on developing major motion sports pictures, unscripted sports films, sports documentaries, and sports entertainment in general. MSM previously included  Mandalay Baseball Properties (MBP), responsible for several professional baseball franchises, sports marketing, stadium development, ownership, management and consulting.

Old divisions 
 Dick Clark Productions, which has been co-owned by Mandalay twice, from 2004 to 2007, and again in September 2012.
 Mandalay Baseball LLC, responsible for several professional baseball franchises, sports marketing, stadium development, ownership, management and consulting

References

External links
 Mandalay Entertainment Group

Entertainment companies based in California
Companies based in Los Angeles County, California
Entertainment companies established in 1995
1995 establishments in California
Former Lionsgate subsidiaries